The National Congress of Brazil is the legislative body of Brazil's federal government. Unlike the state legislative assemblies and municipal chambers, the Congress is bicameral, composed of the Federal Senate (the upper house) and the Chamber of Deputies (the lower house). The Congress meets annually in Brasília from 2 February to 22 December, with a mid-term break taking place between 17 July and 1 August.

The Senate represents the 26 states and the Federal District. Each state and the Federal District has a representation of three senators, who are elected by popular ballot for a term of eight years. Every four years, renewal of either one third or two-thirds of the Senate (and of the delegations of the States and the Federal District) takes place. The Chamber of Deputies represents the people of each state, and its members are elected for a four-year term by a system of proportional representation. Seats are allotted proportionally according to each state's population, with each state eligible for a minimum of 8 seats (least populous) and a maximum of 70 seats (most populous). Unlike the Senate, the whole of the Chamber of Deputies is renewed every four years.

Until recently it was common for politicians to switch parties and the proportion of congressional seats held by each party would often change. Seats belong to the parties and not to the politicians; one can only change parties and retain his or her seat in a very limited set of cases. Politicians who abandon the party for which they were elected now face the loss of their congressional seat. Each house of the Brazilian Congress elects its president and the other members of its directing board from among its members. The President of the Senate is ex officio the President of the National Congress, and in that capacity summons and presides over joint sessions, as well as over the joint services of both houses. The President of the Chamber is second in the presidential line of succession while the President of the Senate (and of Congress) is third.

Board of the National Congress 
The current composition of the Board of the National Congress is as follows:

Houses

Federal Senate 

The Federal Senate is the upper house of the National Congress. Created by the first Constitution of the Brazilian Empire in 1824, it was inspired in United Kingdom's House of Lords, but with the Proclamation of the Republic in 1889 it became closer to the United States Senate.
Currently, the Senate comprises 81 seats. Three senators from each of the 26 states and three senators from the Federal District are elected on a majority basis to serve eight-year terms. Elections are staggered so that two-thirds of the upper house is up for election at one time and the remaining one-third four years later. When one seat is up for election in each State, each voter casts one vote for the Senate; when two seats are up for election, each voter casts two votes, and the voter cannot give his two votes for the same candidate, but, in elections for the renewal of two-thirds of the Senate, each party can present two candidates for election. The candidate in each State and the Federal District (or the first two candidates, when two-thirds of the seats are up for election) who achieve the greatest plurality of votes are elected.

Chamber of Deputies 

The Chamber of Deputies is the lower house of the National Congress, it is composed of 513 federal deputies, who are elected by a proportional representation of votes to serve a four-year term. Seats are allotted proportionally according to each state's population, with each state eligible for a minimum of 8 seats (least populous) and a maximum of 70 seats (most populous).

In 2018, 24 out of the country's 33 political parties were able to elect at least one representative in the Chamber, while sixteen of them were able to elect at least one senator.

 See the Latest election section for election results table.

Building 

In early 1900s, the Brazilian National Congress happened to be in separate buildings in Rio de Janeiro which was then the national capital. The Senate was located near Railway Central Station, beside the Republica Square, at Moncorvo Filho Street, where there is today a Federal University of Rio de Janeiro students' center. The Federal Chamber of Deputies was located at Misericórdia Street, which would later be the location of the State of Rio de Janeiro's local Chamber of Deputies. From the 1930s to early 1960s, the Senate occupied the Monroe Palace, which was demolished in the 1970s to allow the construction of the subway Cinelândia Station. The Federal Chamber of Deputies moved to Brasília in the early 1960s, a process that took years to complete.

Since the 1960s, the National Congress has been located in Brasília. As with most of the city's government buildings, the National Congress building was designed by Oscar Niemeyer.

The semi-sphere on the left is the seat of the Senate, and the semi-sphere on the right is the seat of the Chamber of the Deputies. Between them are two vertical office towers.

The building is located in the middle of the Monumental Axis, the main street of Brasília. In front of it there is a large lawn where demonstrations take place. At the back of it, is the Praça dos Três Poderes ('Three Powers Plaza'), where lies the Palácio do Planalto and the Supreme Federal Court.

On 6 December 2007, the Institute of Historic and Artistic National Heritage decided to declare the building of the National Congress a historical heritage of the Brazilian people. The building has also been a UNESCO World Heritage Site, as part of Brasília's original urban buildings, since 1987.

2023 storming 

On 8 January 2023, supporters of the former president Jair Bolsonaro invaded and vandalized the Brazilian National Congress as well as other federal buildings in Brasília.

Gallery

National Congress building

Latest election

Chamber of Deputies

Federal Senate

Legislatures 
The Legislatures are counted from the first meeting of the Chamber of Deputies and of the Senate, on 6 May 1826, in the imperial era (the Chamber of Deputies met for preparatory sessions from 29 April 1826 onwards to elect its officers and conduct other preliminary business, but the Legislature was formally opened on 6 May). The Chamber of Deputies and the Senate were created by Brazil's first Constitution, the Constitution of the Empire of Brazil, adopted in 1824. The previous Constituent and Legislative Assembly of the Empire of Brazil, a unicameral National Assembly, that was convened in 1823 and that was dissolved by Emperor Pedro I before adopting a Constitution is not counted among the Legislatures. Thus, the numbering includes only the bicameral Legislatures that existed from 1826 to the present day, and includes only Legislatures elected after the adoption of the first Brazilian Constitution.

In the imperial era, the national legislature was named General Assembly. It was made up of the Chamber of Deputies and the Senate. Senators were elected for life and the Senate was a permanent institution, whereas the Chamber of Deputies, unless dissolved earlier, was elected every four years. When Brazil became a Republic and a Federal State the model of a bicameral Legislature was retained at the Federal level, but the Parliament was renamed National Congress. The National Congress is made up of the Chamber of Deputies and the Federal Senate. Both Houses have fixed terms and cannot be dissolved earlier. Under Brazil's present Constitution, adopted in 1988, Senators are elected to eight-year terms, and Deputies are elected every four years.

The numbering of the Legislatures is continuous, including the Legislatures of the imperial General Assembly and of the republican National Congress. The inauguration of a new composition of Chamber of Deputies for a four-year term of office marks the start of a new Legislature.

Notes

References

See also 
 Chamber of Deputies (Brazil)
 Federal Senate (Brazil)
 List of legislatures by country
 Palácio do Planalto
 Politics of Brazil

External links 

 National Congress 
 Chamber of Deputies of Brazil 
 Chamber of Deputies' e-Democracy 
 Senate of Brazil 
 Photos 360° of National Congress 

 
Brazil
Oscar Niemeyer buildings
Brazil
Brazil